Sūn Kèhóng (Sun K'o-hung, traditional: 孫克弘, simplified: 孙克弘); ca. 1533-1611 was a Chinese landscape painter, calligrapher, and poet during the Ming Dynasty (1368–1644).

Sun was born in Huating in the Shanghai province. His style name was 'Yunzhi' and his sobriquet was 'Xueju'. Sun's painting followed the style of Shen Zhou and Lu Zhi. Sun used colorful and minute techniques in his earlier works, then later used a more terse and free style. In addition to landscapes Sun painted flower and bird and bamboo and stone works.

References

1533 births
1611 deaths
Painters from Shanghai
Ming dynasty landscape painters
Ming dynasty calligraphers
Ming dynasty poets
Poets from Shanghai
17th-century Chinese calligraphers
16th-century Chinese calligraphers